The Copa Apertura 1998 was the 27th edition of the Chilean Cup tournament. The competition started on February 14, 1998, and concluded on April 1, 1998. Only first level teams took part in the tournament. Universidad de Chile won the competition for their second time, beating Audax Italiano on the finals.

Calendar

Group Round

Group 1

Group 2

Group 3

Group 4

Semifinals

Finals

First Leg

Second Leg

Top goalscorer
Alejandro Carrasco (Audax Italiano) 5 goals

See also
 1998 Campeonato Nacional

References
RSSSF

Copa Chile
Chile
1998